Ferns railway station was a railway station which served Ferns, County Wexford. It opened on 16 November 1863, closed to passenger traffic on 30 March 1964 and to goods traffic on 3 November 1975, before finally closing altogether on 7 March 1977. Currently, the Irish Rail trains run fast through the site of the station on the Dublin–Rosslare railway line linking Rosslare Europort to Dublin Connolly.

References

Iarnród Éireann stations in County Wexford
Disused railway stations in County Wexford
Railway stations opened in 1863
Railway stations closed in 1977
1863 establishments in Ireland
1977 disestablishments in Ireland
Railway stations in the Republic of Ireland opened in the 19th century